Anton Munteanu (3 July 1932 – 22 May 2007) was a Romanian footballer.

Club career

Anton Munteanu was born on 3 July 1932 in Bucharest and spent his entire career from junior to senior level playing alongside his twin brother Dumitru Munteanu, both of them being known for their dribbling abilities and spectacular play. He grew up in Dămăroaia and started to play junior level football at the local club, afterwards going at Laromet București, before moving at CCA Cluj where he spent only two weeks, then he joined Gloria Bistrița, a team he helped reach in 1954 a promotion play-off to Divizia B which was eventually lost. He made his Divizia A debut on 10 April 1955, playing for CCA București in a 9–1 away victory against Avântul Reghin in which he scored a goal. In 1956 he went to play for Petrolul Ploiești where he spent 7 seasons in which he helped the club win the 1962–63 Cupa României, scoring a goal in the 6–1 victory from the final against Siderurgistul Galați. In 1958, he and his brother were banned for life from playing football because they were considered "rebels" and "bourgeois elements" by the Communist regime, but after one year they were allowed to play again. In 1961 after Petrolul played a friendly against Brazilian team, Grêmio Porto Alegre which ended with a 4–3 victory in which he and his brother were appreciated for their play, they were nicknamed "The Brazilians". Munteanu made his last Divizia A appearance playing for The Yellow Wolves on 1 November 1964 in a 1–0 away loss against Steaua București. He has a total of 119 matches played and 36 goals scored in Divizia A, 14 matches and five goals scored in Cupa României and 9 games in European competitions in which he scored one goal (including 6 appearances and one goal in the Inter-Cities Fairs Cup). Anton Dumitru died on 22 May 2007 at age 73.

International career
Anton Munteanu made one appearance for Romania's national team being used by coach Gheorghe Popescu I as a starter, playing until the 80th minute when he was replaced by Alexandru Ene in a friendly against Bulgaria which ended with a 2–0 loss.

Honours
CCA București
Cupa României: 1955
Petrolul Ploiești
Cupa României: 1962–63

References

External links
Anton Munteanu at Labtof.ro

1932 births
2007 deaths
Romanian footballers
Romania international footballers
Association football forwards
Liga I players
ACF Gloria Bistrița players
FC Petrolul Ploiești players
FC Steaua București players
Sportspeople from Bucharest
Romanian twins
Twin sportspeople